Klaudio Çema (born 22 April 1995) is an Albanian professional footballer who plays as a centre-back for KF Elbasani.

Club career
On 2 June 2017, following the end of 2016–17 season, Çema was released by Kukësi after spending almost all the season on bench.

Honours
Kukësi

Albanian Superliga: 2016–17

References

1995 births
Living people
Footballers from Tirana
Albanian footballers
Association football defenders
Albania youth international footballers
FK Partizani Tirana players
KF Elbasani players
FK Kukësi players
KF Tërbuni Pukë players
NK Lučko players
FK Dinamo Tirana players
KF Laçi players
Kategoria e Parë players
Kategoria Superiore players